Tooth and Nail is a 2007 horror film written, directed and edited by Mark Young, about a group of people in a post-apocalyptic world who must fight to survive against a band of vicious cannibals.

Plot 
After an apocalypse, mankind has depleted all fossil fuel reserves and civilization has collapsed. A group of survivors called "Foragers" take cover in an abandoned hospital where the group attempt to re-build society. After saving a young girl from being killed and eaten by a group of vicious cannibals called "Rovers", the Foragers find themselves on the run from the cannibals, who stalk the survivors and brutally kill them off one-by-one as the Foragers begin to fight back, causing a chaotic battle of blood and mayhem.

Cast
 Rachel Miner as "Neon"
 Nicole DuPort as Dakota
 Rider Strong as Ford
 Michael Kelly as "Viper"
 Robert Carradine as Darwin
 Michael Madsen as "Jackal"
 Vinnie Jones as "Mongrel"
 Alexandra Barreto as Torino
 Emily Catherine Young as Nova
 Beverly Hynds as Victoria
 Patrick Durham as Shepherd
 Jonathan Sachar as Wolf
 Garrett Ching as "Pug"
 Kevin E. Scott as Max

Release
This film was released in theaters as part of After Dark Film's Horrorfest, which ran November 9–18, 2007.

External links
 
 
 

2007 films
2007 horror films
2000s science fiction horror films
American post-apocalyptic films
American science fiction horror films
Films scored by Elia Cmíral
Films about cannibalism
American slasher films
2000s English-language films
Films directed by Mark Young
2000s American films